Smith Branch is a stream in Montgomery County in the U.S. state of Missouri. It is a tributary of Clear Fork of the Loutre River.

It continues to the west-northwest to its confluence with Clear Fork at  approximately three miles southwest of Montgomery City.

Smith Branch has the name of James Smith, a pioneer citizen.

See also
List of rivers of Missouri

References

Rivers of Montgomery County, Missouri
Rivers of Missouri